Piet de Boer (10 October 1919 – 8 February 1984) was a Dutch football forward who was part of the Netherlands squad in the 1938 FIFA World Cup.

Club career
Being able to shoot with either foot, de Boer played for KFC until 1954.

International career
He was capped once, scoring three goals, in a friendly in 1937 against Luxembourg and still has the highest goal scoring average for the Dutch team. Also, at just over 18 years he is now the 10th youngest player who made his debut for Oranje.

References

External links

 FIFA profile

1919 births
1984 deaths
Footballers from Amsterdam
Association football forwards
Dutch footballers
Netherlands international footballers
1938 FIFA World Cup players

nl:Piet de Boer